Ursula Benser, née Ursula Maria Luise Heuser (1915–2001) was a German painter and draftsperson. She worked in pastels, watercolor, and gouache, on paper or canvas.

She was born on 1 August 1915 in Düsseldorf, Germany, to parents Mira (née Sohn-Rethel), and painter Werner Heuser. Her brother was Klaus Heinrich Heuser (1909–1994), her maternal grandfather was Karl Rudolf Sohn, and her maternal great-grandfather was Karl Ferdinand Sohn. In 1936, she was married to photographer, Walther Benser.

References 

1915 births
2001 deaths
Kunstakademie Düsseldorf alumni
Artists from Düsseldorf
German women painters

German watercolourists